Araiza is a surname. Notable people with the surname include:

Armando Araiza (born 1969), Mexican actor
Francisco Araiza (born 1950), Mexican operatic tenor
José Joaquín Araiza (1900–1971), Mexican chess master
Manuel Enrique Ovalle Araiza (born 1968), Mexican politician 
Matt Araiza (born 2000), American football player
Raúl Araiza (born 1964), Mexican actor and television presenter
Raúl Araiza (director) (1935–2013), Mexican director, actor and producer

See also
Ariza (surname)